This article lists lists of forests.

By country 

 Forests of Australia
 List of Brazilian National Forests
 List of forests in Canada
 List of forests in Denmark
 List of forests in France
 List of forests in Iceland
 List of forests in India
 List of forests in Ireland
 List of forests in Israel
 List of Liberian national forests
 List of forests in Lithuania
 Forests of Mexico
 Forests of Poland
 List of forests in Serbia
 List of forests of South Africa
 Forests of Sweden
 List of Forest Parks of Thailand
 List of forests in the United Kingdom
 List of U.S. National Forests

By U.S. state 

 List of Alabama state forests
 List of Alaska state forests
 List of Arizona state forests
 List of Arkansas state forests
 List of California state forests
 List of Colorado state forests
 List of Connecticut state forests
 List of Delaware state forests
 List of Florida state forests
 List of Georgia state forests
 List of Hawaii state forests
 List of Idaho state forests
 List of Illinois state forests
 List of Indiana state forests
 List of Iowa state forests
 List of Kansas state forests
 List of Kentucky state forests
 List of Louisiana state forests
 List of Maine state forests
 List of Maryland state forests
 List of Massachusetts state forests
 List of Michigan state forests
 List of Minnesota state forests
 List of Mississippi state forests
 List of Missouri state forests
 List of forests in Montana
 List of Nebraska state forests
 List of Nevada state forests
 List of New Hampshire state forests
 List of New Jersey state forests
 List of New Mexico state forests
 List of New York state forests
 List of North Carolina state forests
 List of North Dakota state forests
 List of Ohio state forests
 List of Oklahoma state forests
 List of Oregon state forests
 List of Pennsylvania state forests
 List of Rhode Island state forests
 List of South Carolina state forests
 List of South Dakota state forests
 List of Tennessee state forests
 List of Texas state forests
 List of Utah state forests
 List of Vermont state forests
 List of Virginia state forests
 List of Washington state forests
 List of West Virginia state forests
 List of Wisconsin state forests
 List of Wyoming state forests

See also 
 List of countries by forest area